The 2014 FAI Cup Final was the final match of the 2014 FAI Cup, the national association football cup of the Republic of Ireland. The match took place on 2 November 2014 at the Aviva Stadium in Dublin,  and was contested between Derry City and St Patrick's Athletic, with St. Pat's being the winners by two goals to nil.
	
The match was broadcast live on RTÉ Two and RTÉ Two HD in Ireland, and via the RTÉ Player worldwide.	
	
Christy Fagan scored twice for St Patrick's Athletic as they beat Derry City 2-0.

Match

References

External links
Official Site

Final
FAI Cup finals
Fai Cup Final 2014
Fai Cup Final 2014
FAI Cup Final, 2014
FAI Cup Final